Justin Kenny (born 24 September 1966) is an Australian cricketer. He played four first-class matches for New South Wales between 1988/89 and 1990/91.

See also
 List of New South Wales representative cricketers

References

External links
 

1966 births
Living people
Australian cricketers
New South Wales cricketers
Cricketers from Sydney